Belisarius is a 1724 tragedy by the British writer William Phillips. It is based on the life of the Byzantine  general Belisarius, sometimes dubbed the "Last of the Romans".

The original Lincoln's Inn Fields cast included Anthony Boheme as Belisarius, Lacy Ryan as Justinian, Richard Diggs as Vitiges, Thomas Walker as Proclus, James Quin as Hermogenes, John Egleton as Macro, Anne Brett as Almira and Anne Parker as Valeria.

References

Bibliography
 Burling, William J. A Checklist of New Plays and Entertainments on the London Stage, 1700-1737. Fairleigh Dickinson Univ Press, 1992.
 Nicoll, Allardyce. A History of Early Eighteenth Century Drama: 1700-1750. CUP Archive, 1927.

1724 plays
British plays
Tragedy plays
West End plays